Ortha Orrie Barr Sr. (February 24, 1879 – December 5, 1958) was an American lawyer, businessman and politician who served as a two-term Member of the Ohio House of Representatives from January 1931 until January 1935. Together with his physician father, Dr. Eugene Barr, Ortha Barr co-established the historic Barr Hotel in Lima, Ohio, built in 1914 and formally opened in October 1916.

Early life and education
Ortha Orrie Barr was born on February 24, 1879, in Clark County, Ohio, to Dr. Eugene Jacob Barr, a physician and his wife, Sadie C. Michael of Tremont City, Ohio. Eugene and Sadie Barr had married in 1877. The Barr family moved to Allen County in 1885 where Ortha Barr attended local elementary and middle schools. He had a half-sister, Mabel Barr whose mother, Mattie A. Miller, daughter of John G. Miller married Eugene Barr in 1883, presumably after the dissolution of his first marriage. Ortha Barr was a student at the now defunct Lima College, an Evangelical Lutheran institution which operated from 1893 to 1908. Ortha O. Barr was a 1904 LLB graduate of the University of Michigan Law School.

Legal and business career
Barr became one of two Deputy Sheriffs in Allen County in the early 1900s. His father, Dr. E. J. Barr was Allen County Sheriff at the time, winning two terms and serving for 15 years, from 1901 to 1916. In his first election, Eugene Barr defeated his William McComb. From 1911 to 1915. O. O. Barr was an Assistant Prosecuting Attorney for Allen County and became the substantive Prosecuting Attorney from 1915 to 1916, after winning an election. Barr belonged to the Allen County Bar Association. He entered a joint business venture with his father to build the historic seven-storey hotel, Barr Hotel in downtown Lima, Ohio, which officially began operations in October 1916. Over several years, the hotel expanded from the initial 88 rooms to 150 rooms.

Politics
Like his father, Ortha Barr was a member of the Democratic Party and served on the Allen County Central Committee. He again found success in electoral politics when he won the November 1930 polls and became a two-term Allen County Representative in the Ohio House of Representatives from January 1931 to January 1935.

Personal life
On September 4, 1907, Ortha O. Barr married Bertha Anna Woerner (1881-1953) of Burlington, Des Moines, Iowa, with whom he had five children, Catherina A. (died as a toddler), Robert Ortha (1910-1996), Margaret A. (1914-1999), Edna Barr Hunter (1915-2009) and Ortha O. Barr Jr. (1922-2003). Ortha Barr Sr. held different roles in several social clubs and fraternal societies in Ohio, including President (1943–44) of the Lima Sertoma Club, Member, Independent Order of Odd Fellows, local chapter  Grandmaster of the Knights of Pythias and the honorific “Esteemed Lecturing Knight” of the Benevolent and Protective Order of Elks. He was also a Scottish Rite Mason. Ortha Barr followed the footsteps of his father, Eugene Barr, who was also a Knight of Pythias and an Elk. Ortha Barr was a member of the Methodist Episcopal Church.

Parentage
Ortha Orrie Barr’s father, Eugene Barr was born in Auglaize County, Ohio, on September 21, 1857, to medical doctor, Dr. Tobias Barr. Eugene Barr’s mother was Margaret Weaver. Eugene Barr had his early education in Clark County and Lebanon, Ohio. He became a teacher at local schools in Champaign and Clark Counties. He matriculated at the Medical College of Ohio in Cincinnati and graduated on March 3, 1880. He was in private medical practice in Allen County from 1885 to 1895. He later became involved in the oil and timber trades. He was on the boards of the soda manufacturing company, Consolidated Bottling Company of Lima and timber companies, Southern Lumber Company and the Ohio Hardwood Lumber Company.

Later life and death
Ortha Barr Sr. continued operating his family’s hotel business after active retirement from politics. Together with his wife, Bertha and another couple, Barr was involved in an auto accident involving a truck in Wapakoneta, Auglaize County, Ohio in September 1953, on their return from a wedding anniversary vacation in Connersville, Indiana. Barr’s wife died in the accident. He sold his equity stake in the Barr Hotel in 1956 to another hotel operator, C. O. Porter. He also remarried - to Lenna Rudy (born 2 May 1888 in Lima; died 9 April 1972 in Lima), a widow and a former Lima public schoolteacher.

Shortly after their marriage, Barr joined Lena Rudy in Hollywood, Los Angeles, California where she lived with her mother, Belle and worked as a film studio musician.  Ortha Barr died in a rest home on December 5, 1958. He was buried at the Gethsemani Cemetery in Lima, Ohio. When Lena Rudy died in 1972, she was buried in Woodlawn Cemetery, Lima after her funeral at the Trinity United Methodist Church, also in Lima.

References

Notes
 Dr. Tobias Barr was born on April 4, 1813, in Quarryville, Lancaster, Pennsylvania and died on December 25, 1857, in Tremont City, Clark County, Ohio. Dr. Tobias Barr was buried at the Rector-Gard Cemetery in Mad River Township, Champaign County, Ohio. 
 Lena Rudy was previously married to Mack Atschul (born 25 August 1864 in Ohio; died 29 May 1937 in Lima).
 Lenna Rudy was the daughter of physician, Dr. Albert Staley Rudy (born 5 December 1855 in Allen County, died 6 April 1934 in Lima) and his wife, Isabelle "Belle" L. Mumaugh Rudy (born October 1862 in Lafayette, OH; died 20 September 1950 in Hollywood, CA).
 Rudy had a younger brother, Ned (born 24 April 1901 in Allen County; died 21 March 1973 in Folkston, Charlton County, Georgia).

Works cited

1879 births
1958 deaths
Ohio lawyers
People from Allen County, Ohio
Democratic Party members of the Ohio House of Representatives
20th-century American politicians
University of Michigan Law School alumni
Christians from Ohio
Businesspeople from Ohio
20th-century American businesspeople
American Freemasons